Caryatis is a genus of tiger moths in the family Erebidae.

Species
Caryatis hersilia Druce, 1887
Caryatis phileta (Drury, 1782)
Caryatis stenoperas Hampson, 1910

Taxonomy
Caryatis was previously treated as a junior synonym of Amerila.

References

External links
Natural History Museum Lepidoptera generic names catalog

Nyctemerina
Moth genera